Ante Ciliga (20 February 1898 – 21 October 1992) was a Croatian politician, writer and publisher. Ciliga was one of the founders of the Communist Party of Yugoslavia (KPJ). Imprisoned in Stalin's Gulags in the 1930s, he later became an ardent nationalist, anti-Communist and ideologue of Ustashe movement.

Early life
He was born in the small Istrian village of Šegotići (part of Marčana). Istria was then the Austrian Littoral (now in Croatia). The contingencies of history were such that Ciliga, Croat by language and culture, was successively an Austrian citizen until 1919 and then an Italian citizen until 1945. Coming from a family of Croat peasants, his grandfather shared with the young boy "the interest which he showed in Croatian culture and in the struggles for national emancipation directed against the urban Italian bourgeoisie and the German-Austrian administration". Ciliga became a member of the Central Committee and Politbureau of the League of Communists of Yugoslavia (KPJ) as well as the chief editor of Borba and Regional Secretary for Croatia.

In Soviet Union 
Exiled for his activism from Yugoslavia, he moved to Vienna in 1925 as the local representative of the KPJ and then settled in the Soviet Union, where he lived from October 1926 to December 1935. His first three years in the Soviet Union were spent in Moscow, where he worked as a teacher at the party school for émigré Yugoslav Communists. He was a sympathizer of the Left Opposition. He wrote that one possible reason for the rise of Joseph Stalin was that many Soviet politicians, even committed communists, believed that the Soviet Union had backward Asiatic people who needed a dictatorship.

In 1930, Ciliga taught at the Communist University of Leningrad. Arrested by Stalin's political police, the GPU, because of his opposition to the policies of the Soviet government, he was deported to a labor camp in Siberia. Already expelled from the Yugoslav Communist Party in 1929, he later resigned from his position. In The Russian Enigma, his account of his time in the Soviet Union, originally published in France in 1938, Ciliga described his five-year imprisonment in Soviet prisons and Siberian gulags and extensively criticizes Stalin's totalitarian regime and repression.

World War II 
At the end of 1941, Ciliga returned to the then Independent State of Croatia (NDH), where he was arrested by the Ustashas and imprisoned for one year in the Jasenovac concentration camp. Ciliga later described Jasenovac as a "huge machine" with the sole purpose, that "some be killed as soon as they enter–others, over time... Jasenovac resembled Auschwitz. In Jasenovac, the main thing was not forced labor, but extermination", but "the primitivistic cruelties of Jasenovac distinguished this Balkan Auschwitz". Having been imprisoned in Stalin's Siberian gulags, Ciliga wrote that what he "experienced there did not even remotely reach the physical, material horrors of Jasenovac."

Released from Jasenovac in December 1942, Ciliga contributed to the Ustasha ideological magazine Spremnost. In 1944, he moved to Nazi Berlin, residing in the embassy of NDH.

Postwar 
As political émigré, Ciliga lived in Italy and France, where he edited anticommunist and anti-Yugoslav publications. Having abandoned communist politics, he became an "ardent nationalist".

He wrote books criticizing the Tito regime (State Crisis in Tito’s Yugoslavia) and against Serbs (Dokle će hrvatski narod stenjati pod srpskim jarmom? – For how long will the Croatian people groan under the Serbian yoke?). He also criticized Ante Pavelić in the following manner: "With one word, Pavelić [by his policies] disunited the Croats, united the Serbs, strengthened the Communist Partisans, and blindly tied the Croatian cause to those who were bound to lose the war. It is difficult to imagine a more suicidal policy".

Writing years later, Ciliga noted, "I was for the ustasha (sic) state, I was for the Croatian state. And I defend that thesis. The ustasha (sic) state needed to be reformed, not destroyed."

Ciliga was criticized for anti-Semitic remarks in his Jasenovac writings, which were later repeated by Franjo Tuđman in his Jasenovac book, which also caused a storm of criticism. After Croatia's independence, Ciliga returned to Croatia, where he died in 1992.

Works
The Russian Enigma (1940, 1979)
The Kronstadt Revolt (1942)
Štorice iz Proštine (1944, 2004) (Published under the pseudonym of Tone Valić)
Lenin and Revolution (1948)
Sibérie, Terre de l'Exil et de l'Industrialisation (1950)
The Southern Slavic people between East and West, in La Révolution prolétarienne (1950)-
Dokle ce hrvatski narod stenjati pod srpskim jarmom? (1952)
La crisi di stato nella Jugoslavia di Tito (1972)
State Crisis in Tito’s Yugoslavia (1974)
Sam kroz Europu u ratu (1954, 1978)
U zemlji velike laži (2007)
Posljednji hrvatski argonaut dr. Ante Ciliga – razgovori – publisher Matica hrvatska Pazin (2011)

References

Bibliography

Further reading 

 
 "From Tito and the Comintern", Revolutionary History, Vol. 8, No. 1
 Anton Ciliga, The Russian Enigma, Ink-Links, 1979.

1898 births
1992 deaths
People from Marčana
Anti-Stalinist left
Croatian communists
Croatian nationalists
Left communists
Trotskyists
League of Communists of Croatia politicians
Burials at Mirogoj Cemetery
Jasenovac concentration camp survivors